Symphonica is the 11th studio album by the Japanese Zeuhl band Ruins. For this album, Tatsuya Yoshida enlisted the help of a keyboard player (Kenichi Oguchi) and two female singers (Emi Eleonola and Aki Kubota) to remake several older Ruins songs. Yoshida is also joined by bassist Hisashi Sasaki.

Track listing

 "Thebes" – 7:40
 "Graviyaunosch" – 6:21
 "Big Head" – 7:34
 "Praha In Spring" – 4:37
 "Thrive" – 5:00
 "Infect" – 10:14
 "Brixon Varromiks" – 8:41
 "Bliezzaning Moltz" – 7:12

Personnel
Tatsuya Yoshida:  drums, vocals
Hisashi Sasaki:  bass, vocals
Kenichi Oguchi:  keyboards
Emi Eleonola:  vocals
Aki Kubota:  vocals

References

External links
Ground and Sky review

1998 albums
Ruins (Japanese band) albums